Veronica Pivetti (born 19 February 1965) is an Italian actress and voice actress.

Life and career 
Born in Milan, Pivetti is the daughter of Grazia Gabrielli, a voice actress and of Paolo Pivetti, a stage director. She is the younger sister of the politician Irene Pivetti. She started her career as a voice actress at 8 years old, specializing in dubbing anime and cartoons.  Pivetti studied painting at Accademia di Brera in Milan and briefly worked as studio assistant for an artist before focusing on acting again.After several appearances in the variety show Quelli che... il Calcio, in 1995 Pivetti made her film debut, chosen by the actor and director Carlo Verdone to play his wife in the box office hit Viaggi di nozze.   After appearing in several more films, notably Lina Wertmüller's The Blue Collar Worker and the Hairdresser in a Whirl of Sex and Politics, Pivetti later focused her activities on television, playing main roles in a number of successful TV-series, including Commesse, Il maresciallo Rocca and Provaci ancora prof.  In 1998 Pivetti hosted the Sanremo Music Festival alongside Raimondo Vianello and Eva Herzigová.

References

External links 
 

Italian film actresses
Italian television actresses
Italian stage actresses
Brera Academy alumni
1965 births
Actresses from Milan
Living people
20th-century Italian actresses
21st-century Italian actresses